Oszkár Csuvik (March 28, 1925 – October 23, 2008) was a Hungarian water polo player who competed in the 1948 Summer Olympics.

Biography
He was born in Budapest. He was part of the Hungarian team which won the silver medal, and he played five matches.

See also
 List of Olympic medalists in water polo (men)

References

External links
 

1925 births
2008 deaths
Water polo players from Budapest
Hungarian male water polo players
Olympic silver medalists for Hungary in water polo
Water polo players at the 1948 Summer Olympics
Medalists at the 1948 Summer Olympics
20th-century Hungarian people
21st-century Hungarian people